The Saudi ambassador in Stockholm is the official representative of the Government in Riyadh to the Government of Sweden.
With residence in Stockholm he is concurrently accredited in Oslo and Copenhague.
In 2017, Swedish military exports rose by two percent, totalling 11.3 billion Swedish krona, of which exports to Saudi Arabia accounted for 7 million Swedish krona.

List of representatives

References 

 
Sweden
Saudi Arabia